Cambridge Judge Business School is the business school of the University of Cambridge. The School is a provider of management education. It is named after Sir Paul Judge, a founding benefactor of the school.

The School is considered to be particularly strong in entrepreneurship and innovation management, thanks to its embeddedness in the high tech cluster called the Silicon Fen, with its own accelerator and close ties with Cambridge Enterprise, the university's technology transfer office.

The School is situated on the site of the Old Addenbrooke's Site on Trumpington Street, near the Fitzwilliam Museum.

Administration and governance

The School is a department of the university's School of Technology administrative group.

History

Founding and early years
The School was established in 1990 as the Judge Institute for Management Studies. In 1991, donations from Sir Paul and Lady Judge, together with the Monument Trust, provided the funds for the construction of a building for the newly formed business school. Architect John Outram was appointed to the project, which was completed in August 1995 and officially opened by Queen Elizabeth II.

Prior to the founding of the business school, management studies had been taught at the university since 1954.

Name changes
In September 2005, the Judge Institute of Management Studies was renamed as the Judge Business School. It then adopted the title Cambridge Judge Business School during 2010, and revised its logo to read "University of Cambridge Judge Business School" rather than "Cambridge Judge Business School" in November 2010.

25th anniversary
The School celebrated its 25th anniversary in 2015, with a year-long programme of celebratory events. These included breaking ground on a new building—the Simon Sainsbury Centre; the promotion of a women's leadership initiative; the launch new Centres for Entrepreneurship and Social Innovation; and an anniversary reception at the Palace of Westminster in London hosted by Lord Bilimoria.

Benefactor Sir Paul Judge died in 2017.

Architecture
John Outram converted the listed ward blocks and arcades of the old hospital building, and rebuilt the central block into a space that now contains a library, common room, seminar and teaching rooms, floating staircases and balconies, break-out boxes and the main hall. He also added three new buildings:
 The Ark, containing rooms for faculty, research graduates, and administrative staff.
 The Castle, containing two key lecture theatres and MBA teaching spaces and room.
 The Gallery, an 80 feet (24.5m) high space containing seminar rooms, multi-level circulation routes, and part of the hall.

Programmes

PhD and Research Masters
CJBS provides Ph.D. and advanced master's degrees such as MPhil in Innovation Strategy and Organisation and MPhil Strategy, Marketing and Operations. These courses have the highest requirement within the University of Cambridge and Judge Business School with the lowest acceptance rate of less than 10%. All students have received First Class Honours or GPA4.0 for bachelor's degree level.

MBA
The full-time "Cambridge MBA" is the flagship MBA programme of the university. , there are 210 students attending the 12-month programme, of which 96% come from outside of the UK, and 47% of students are women. Admissions standards are high, with an average Graduate Management Admission Test score of 680. The average age of students on the full-time MBA is 29 and generally students come with extensive work experience in distinguished firms. MBA students from Cambridge Judge Business School and Oxford's Saïd Business School maintain a friendly rivalry and have numerous opportunities throughout the year to meet for athletic events and business conferences.

Master of Accounting (Cambridge MAcc)
The Cambridge Master of Accounting is a part-time, two-year degree programme to develop next generation global thought-leaders in accounting and related fields. The curriculum is designed, in consultation with global leading practice leaders, to help students learn to make complex decisions in the face of ambiguity relying on knowledge of accounting standards, judgment, and discretion; formulate questions, gather data, apply statistical techniques, and persuasively communicate inferences; and to anticipate and incorporate innovation.

The programme is oriented towards leadership and change management, not technical professional certification. Core courses include data and descriptive analytics, policy discussion regarding audit practice, financial reporting, and sustainability reporting, and courses in change management and interpersonal dynamics. The Cambridge MAcc is designed to accelerate students for leadership roles within current employment or help students transition to roles such as accounting firm partnership, CFO, Controller, financial leadership, market regulator, climate-related or social-related disclosure, and finance or accounting public policy.

Master of Studies in Entrepreneurship
The MSt in Entrepreneurship is an academic programme focussed on developing impactful entrepreneurs.

Executive MBA (EMBA)
The School also offers the "Cambridge Executive MBA" for those who have already reached a senior level in their organisations or professions, and are seeking to study part-time while maintaining their current role. As of 2017, the average age of students is 38, with around 14 years of working experience, who from a wide range of professional backgrounds.

Master of Finance (MFin)
The Master of Finance is a one-year specialist finance course designed for people with at least two years' experience in the finance and banking world who wish to accelerate their career in finance. The course is designed to give students a rigorous grounding in the theory and practice of finance. It combines a set of core courses that provide the theoretical and statistical foundations for a range of electives that cover the main areas of applied finance. There are three compulsory projects and one optional one, which help students to integrate theory and practice.

MPhil Management
The Master in Management is a one-year full-time, pre-experience postgraduate programme designed for students who have not previously studied business or management and who wish to pursue a professional career in business. This programme aims to admit and educate outstanding students, both academically and in terms of personality and maturity, who are likely to become leaders in their chosen fields. The core of the MPhil in Management is grounded in the latest advances in business and management theory and practice and covers quantitative methods, accounting, organisational behaviour and analysis and marketing (foundation); business economics, finance and strategy (consolidation), operations management and the Management Consulting Project (implementation). This is complemented by a range of electives aligned to potential careers in management.

MPhil Finance
The MPhil Finance is a one-year postgraduate course in finance designed for people with no prior work experience. The programme combines advanced study and research and is especially suitable for students intending to continue to a Ph.D. although the majority of graduates decides to work in the financial industry. Based on the number of applications, the MPhil Finance programme is the most competitive degree offered by the whole of the University of Cambridge; applicants need the equivalent to a first class degree to even be considered. Students on the MPhil Finance programme can choose from a variety of modules offered by the business school, the Faculty of Economics and the Maths Faculty.

MPhil Technology Policy

The MPhil in Technology Policy is an intensive, nine-month masters programme designed for people with a background in science or engineering who are interested in developing the skills needed to meet the challenges of: integrating technology, management, economics and policy.

MSt Social Innovation

The Master of Studies in Social Innovation is a part-time postgraduate programme for practitioners in the business, public and social sectors.

Executive Education open and custom programmes

The Executive Education portfolio consists of over 20 open enrollment programmes, typically two-day to three-week programmes covering fundamental business management topics such as: finance, marketing, general management and strategy. These programmes are taught by Cambridge Judge Business School faculty and academic staff from the wider University of Cambridge community.

Cambridge Judge Business School also offers custom programmes which are tailored to the specific learning and development requirements of an organisation. Programmes are delivered internationally in areas such as leadership, strategy and finance.

Other
 Professional Practice Masters and Diplomas
 Programmes for members of the University of Cambridge
 The Digital Business Academy
 DisruptEd Venture Creation Weekend: An annual intensive mentoring weekend to encourage and support new edtech start-ups.
 The Judge Business School collaborates with the Cambridge Centre for Development Studies for the MPhil in Development Studies.

Research centres

 Alternative Finance
 Business Research
 Chinese Management
 Circular Economy
 Endowment Asset Management
 Experimental & Behavioural Economics
 Finance
 Financial Reporting & Accountability
 Health & Leadership Enterprise
 India & Global Business
 International Human Resource Management
 Process Excellence & Innovation
 Psychometrics
 Risk Studies
 Social Innovation
 Wo+Men's Leadership Centre

Reputation and rankings

Rankings
 In the 2022 QS World University Rankings, the University of Cambridge is ranked 2nd in the world
 In the 2022 THE World University Rankings, the University of Cambridge is ranked 5th in the world
 In the 2022 Academic Ranking of World Universities the University of Cambridge is ranked 4th in the world

Research Excellence Framework
In the most recent Research Excellence Framework conducted in 2021, the Judge Business School was ranked the number one research department in the UK for business and management studies.

Directors of the School (Deans)
 Prof Stephen Watson, 1990 to 1994
 Dame Sandra Dawson (academic), 1995 to 2006
 Prof Arnoud De Meyer, 2006 to August 2010
 Prof Geoff Meeks, acting director, September 2010 to August 2011
 Prof Christoph Loch, 2011 to 2021
 Prof Mauro Guillen started in September 2021 and stepped down in 2023 to be replaced by an Acting Dean

Notable alumni
 Diezani Alison-Madueke, politician and former President of OPEC
 Ben Barry, author and entrepreneur
 Semaan Bassil, Chairman & General Manager of Byblos Bank S.A.L.
 Alison Brittain, CEO of Whitbread, Former head of Lloyds Banking Group
 Badr Jafar, CEO of Crescent Enterprises
 Maggie O'Carroll, co-founder of The Women's Organisation
 Ollie Phillips (rugby union), former Captain of England Sevens and '7s World Rugby Player of the Year'
 Tom Ransley, British rower and Olympic gold medalist
 Eben Upton, co-founder of the Raspberry Pi Foundation
 Zhang Zetian, chief fashion adviser at JD.com

Notable faculty
 Dame Sandra Dawson (academic), KPMG Professor of Management Studies from 1995 to 2013, and Director of the School from 1995 to 2006, Fellow of Sidney Sussex
 Prof Christoph Loch, Professor of Management Studies and Former Director of the School (2011 to 2021), Fellow of Pembroke College
 Prof Mark de Rond, Professor of Organisational Ethnography, Fellow of Darwin College
 Prof Sucheta Nadkarni, until October 2019, Sinyi Professor of Chinese Management, Fellow of Newnham College
 Prof Jaideep Prabhu, Nehru Professor of Indian Enterprise, Fellow of Clare College

References

External links
 

Business schools in England
Cambridge Judge Business School
Business School, Judge
1990 establishments in England